Football Club Hajvalia 2020, commonly known as Hajvalia 2020, is a football club based in village Hajvalia of Pristina, Kosovo. The team is due to begin play from 2020–21 season in the Second Football League of Kosovo, which is the third tier of football in the country.

History
After the dissolution of KF Hajvalia in the summer of 2018, the village of Hajvalia was left without any sports club. While two years later, respectively on 28 April 2020 (date belonging to the date of club registration in the competent authorities) established FC Hajvalia 2020 by a group of friends and former footballers led by Albatrit Matoshi and his friends with great support from the rest of society, businesses and diaspora, where according to club officials, the club's goal will be not just to advance to the above leagues or participate in competitions, but to create a socialization and education platform that crosses the boundaries of sports, especially for footballers of youth categories. Sixteen days later, former president and investor of KF Hajvalia, Mehdin Pergjegjaj was appointed president of the Hajvalia 2020.

Players

Current squad

References

External links
 

2020 establishments in Kosovo
Association football clubs established in 2020
FC Hajvalia 2020